Nordenskiöld or Nordenskjöld can refer to a number of Finnish or Swedish people, who belong to the same noble family:

Nordenskiöld branch:
 Otto Henrik Nordenskiöld, (1747-1832) Swedish Admiral 
 August Nordenskiöld, (1754–1792) alchemist, brother of Otto Henrik
 Adolf Erik Nordenskiöld, (1832–1901) scientist and explorer, son of Nils Gustaf
 Bengt Nordenskiöld, (1891–1983) Swedish Air Force general
 Claës-Henrik Nordenskiöld, (1917–2003) Swedish Air Force major general, son of Bengt
 Erland Nordenskiöld, (1877–1932) archeologist and anthropologist, younger son of Adolf Erik
 Günter von Nordenskjöld (1910–1997), German politician (CDU)
 Gustaf Nordenskiöld, (1868–1895) scholar, elder son of Adolf Erik
 Nils Gustaf Nordenskiöld, (1792–1866) mineralogist and traveller

Nordenskjöld branch:
 Nils Otto Gustaf Nordenskjöld, (1869–1928) explorer and geographer, nephew of Adolf Nordenskiöld

See also 
 The National Biography of Finland
 Swedish-speaking Finns

Finnish noble families
Swedish noble families